Tessala El Merdja is a town and commune in Algiers Province, Algeria. As of 1998, the commune had a total population of 10,792.

See also
Communes of Algeria

References

Communes of Algiers Province